Joy Ryder is the eighteenth album by saxophonist Wayne Shorter released on Columbia in 1988.

Reception
The Allmusic review by Scott Yanow awarded the album 2 stars stating "Wayne Shorter's occasional Columbia records of the 1980's are all disappointments. His compositions (there are seven on this out-of-print set) lacked the originality and quirkiness of his 1960's work and, although his sound was still very much intact, Shorter's improvisations tend to wander a bit aimlessly. On this album, Shorter (doubling on soprano and tenor) is joined by a basic trio (keyboardist Patrice Rushen, bassist Nathan East and drummer Terri Lyne Carrington) and such guest musicians as keyboardists Herbie Hancock and Geri Allen, bassist Darryl Jones and (on "Someplace Called Where") vocalist Dianne Reeves.".

Track listing 
All compositions by Wayne Shorter
 "Joy Ryder" – 6:39
 "Cathay" – 6:25
 "Over Shadow Hill Way" – 6:03
 "Anthem" – 4:20
 "Causeways" – 8:20
 "Daredevil" – 6:25
 "Someplace Called 'Where'" – 5:20

Personnel 
Musicians
 Wayne Shorter – soprano saxophone, tenor saxophone 
 Patrice Rushen – keyboards
 Geri Allen – acoustic piano (tracks 1-3, 5, 7), synthesizers (tracks1-3, 5, 7)
 Herbie Hancock – synthesizers (tracks 4, 7)
 Nathan East – bass (tracks 1-3, 5, 6, 7)
 Darryl Jones – bass (track 4)
 Terri Lyne Carrington – drums
 Frank Colón – percussion (tracks 2, 5)
 Dianne Reeves – vocals (track 7)

Production
 Wayne Shorter – producer, back cover painting
 K2 – co-producer, engineer
 Duncan Aldrich – assistant engineer
 Nancy Donald – art direction, design
 Tony Lane – art direction, design
 Victoria Pearson – cover photography
 Judi Siskind – lettering
 David Rubinson – management

Studios
 Recorded and Mixed at Mad Hatter Studios (Los Angeles, California)
 Mastered at Precision Lacquer (Hollywood, California).

References

1988 albums
Wayne Shorter albums
Columbia Records albums